Stronger is the second studio album by Contemporary Christian music singer Natalie Grant. It was released on June 12, 2001, through Pamplin Records, and was re-released on February 26, 2002, through Curb Records.

Critical reception

Bradley Torreano of AllMusic claimed "Natalie Grant's Stronger is one of the rarest treasures in Christian music: an original album that has a distinct voice and style. With so many CCM pop stars making decent but faceless music, it is a relief to see that there are still albums like this floating around. With a powerhouse voice and top-notch songwriters, Grant brings to mind a wholesome Britney Spears at some points and a spiritual Faith Hill at others. In fact, it is pretty weird to hear what would ordinarily be typical radio pop filled with lyrics about Christian topics and ideologies. But it works; in fact, it works very well. This is one of the freshest approaches to this genre in quite a while, bringing to mind Amy Grant's groundbreaking Heart in Motion. Much like the other Grant, Natalie Grant puts her emphasis on the hooks, something that most CCM artists put in a distant second behind their message. Because of this, she not only gets her message across, but gets it across using music that anyone could get into. This is a very good album that points to the direction that CCM has the potential to go in. Despite the stigma that the genre has with mainstream audiences, any fan of solid pop music should at least give this a chance." CCM Magazines Michael TenBrink stated "It wasn't long ago that Natalie Grant arrived on the Christian music scene amidst much talk that she was poised as a pop diva a la Celine Dion. But despite some success at radio, the buzz about Grant never quite translated into a high profile career. Two years later, Grant is aligned with a new label, a new outlook, and a new album titled Stronger. Stronger indeed. The album is just that in nearly every way over its predecessor, showcasing Grant's powerhouse vocals, which are indeed reminiscent of the aforementioned Dion, as well as Crystal Lewis. Grant wrote or co-wrote five of the 11 tracks featured, including 'Whenever You Need Somebody', a soulful bring-the-house down duet with immensely popular Plus One. Although she occasionally ventures into dance territory, Grant is at her strongest on from-the-gut pop songs like 'If the World Lost All Its Love'. Other highlights are the first single, 'Keep on Shining', as well as the emotional 'I Love to Praise'. But Grant most transparently shows her depth as an artist on the album's closer, 'Finally Home', co-written with Cindy Morgan. The song is a gorgeous six-minute epic ballad that moves from a place of tears to a place of joy and external hope. Stronger hangs together impressively well. When Natalie Grant wraps herself around a great song, she is easily in the upper echelon of female vocalists in the Christian music community." John Daniels of Cross Rhythms said "Stronger is the second album from Natalie Grant, who two years ago was being hailed as 'the new Diva of Christian music'. The big voice that earned her that title is still there and heard to good effect on this album. Alas, despite a change of label and a plethora of production talent, the album somehow disappoints—perhaps it's the lack of any songs strong enough to match that voice. Or perhaps because despite the work of five producers it's amazing how alike the tracks sound. Soft pop is the order of the day, and nothing wrong with that. 'When Ever You Need Somebody' is a soulful ballad featuring Christian boy band Plus One and is understandably already getting heavy airplay in the States. Another of the five tracks which Natalie had a hand in writing, 'Such A Wonder', expresses well the awe we feel that God would care for us as individuals. There is a Latin flavor to 'I Love To Praise' and 'Don't Wanna Make A Move' is somewhere between Jennifer (Lopez) and Britney. 'Finally Home', the last of the eleven tracks on the album, brings a closing note of encouragement to this 'late evening' album." The Phantom Tollbooth's Zik Jackson remarked "When Natalie Grant recorded her self-titled album featuring the hit 'I Am Not Alone', it appeared that she was on her way to CCM stardom. However, she ended up in record contract limbo for a time and seemed to disappear from the scene. During that period, she wrote or co-wrote the eleven songs that form her comeback album, Stronger, released on Pamplin Records. Stronger is an understatement, for Grant not only belts out wonderful pop ballads and peppy danceable hits, but her voice is absolutely stellar throughout the album. Coupled with tight production by newlywed husband Bernie Herms, veterans Tedd T., and John and Dino Elefante, among others, Grant delivers a must-have collection of contemporary tunes that puts her back on the road to stardom. Stronger is another great album you can leave on repeat in your CD player and enjoy for days. Natalie Grant is back with a vengeance, stronger than ever."

Track listing

Personnel 
 Natalie Grant – vocals, backing vocals 
 Reed Vertelney – programming, sequencing, arrangements, backing vocals 
 Bernie Herms – acoustic piano, programming, sequencing, arrangements
 Phil Sillas – programming, sequencing, arrangements
 Eric Foster White – keyboards, drum programming, arrangements, string arrangements
 Danny Duncan – programming 
 Tim Heintz – programming, sequencing
 David Cleveland – guitars 
 Terrence Elliot – acoustic guitar, electric guitar 
 Dan Petty – guitars
 Tim Pierce – acoustic guitar, electric guitar 
 Michael Thompson – electric guitar 
 Tedd T – guitars, arrangements
 Aaron Featherstone – guitars, string arrangements
 Andy Chicon – bass 
 Matt Pierson – bass 
 Dan Needham – drums, programming 
 Eric Darken – percussion 
 David Hamilton – string arrangements and conductor 
 Gary Lindsay – orchestration 
 Carl Gorodetzky – concertmaster 
 Nashville String Machine – strings 
 Bernie Barlow – backing vocals 
 Angela Cruz – backing vocals 
 Windy Wagner – backing vocals 
 Plus One – vocals (3)
 John Elefante – backing vocals

Release history

References

2001 albums
Curb Records albums
Natalie Grant albums
Pamplin Music albums